The Potez 53 was a French low-wing enclosed cockpit single-seat cantilever monoplane racing aircraft built by Potez to specifically to compete in the 1933 Coupe Deutsch de la Meurthe race, which it won outright.

Design and development
It was powered by a supercharged 9-cylinder  Potez 9B air-cooled radial engine driving a two-bladed fixed pitch propeller. The primary structure and covering was wood. The undercarriage retracted outwards into the undersides of the wings while the tailskid was fixed.
 
Two machines were entered for the 1933 Coupe Deutsch de la Meurthe. The other (racing no.12) was flown by Gustave Lemoine, who retired after completing the fourth lap.

Following this success, a new machine designated the Potez 533 (or 53-3) was built with various improvements for the 1934 race, including an uprated engine delivering  driving a Ratier variable-pitch propeller, slimmer and more streamlined fuselage and redesigned wings of increased area. One of the two aircraft entered the previous years was refurbished as the Potez 532 (or 53-2), to act as a backup in the competition. The engine was uprated, its fuselage was slightly lengthened for aerodynamic reasons, the wing was further enlarged and additional flaps were installed between the fuselage and ailerons.

The two aircraft were flown by the same pilots as the previous year, but neither completed the 1934 race. Gustave Lemoine, who was flying the Potez 533 (racing no.3), completed ten  circuits with an average speed  before being forced to withdraw due to a problem with the variable-pitch propeller. Georges Détré, who was flying the older machine (racing no.1), completed only eight circuits before a broken oil pipe forced him to abandon the race.

Aircraft on display
The unmodified Potez 53 which won the 1933 race is preserved in the Musée de l'Air et de l'Espace. (France)

Specifications (1933 Potez 53)

Notes

References

 
 

 
  

 
 
 

1930s French sport aircraft
053
Single-engined tractor aircraft
Low-wing aircraft
Aircraft first flown in 1933